The Project is the second studio album by British producer Rishi Rich. It was released on 24 July 2006 on 2Point9 Records. It features frequent collaborator Juggy D, JD (Dready), Des-C, Jay Sean, Rafaqat Ali Khan and Veronica Mehta.

Track listing

References

2006 albums
Albums produced by Rishi Rich